The 1919 Australian referendum was held on 13 December 1919. It contained two referendum questions. The referendums were held in conjunction with the 1919 federal election.
__NoTOC__

Results in detail

Legislative Powers
This section is an excerpt from 1919 Australian referendum (Legislative Powers) § Results

Monopolies
This section is an excerpt from 1919 Australian referendum (Monopolies) § Results

See also
Referendums in Australia
Politics of Australia
History of Australia

References

Further reading
  
 .
 Australian Electoral Commission (2007) Referendum Dates and Results 1906 – Present AEC, Canberra.

1919 referendums
1919
Referendum
December 1919 events